Leaf Rapids is a town in north west Manitoba, Canada. The town was developed as an experimental model; a model that other northern communities could replicate as they strove for modern convenience and luxury in a northern environment. The community is located approximately 1,000 km north of Winnipeg along the Churchill River. The original (urban) community of Leaf Rapids is on Manitoba Provincial Road 391, although most of the large official town created later lies east of this community. This town is as large as a typical Rural Municipality in the more southern parts of Manitoba.

An all-weather road connects the community to Thompson, Lynn Lake, and South Indian Lake. Since the establishment of the community, Leaf Rapids has witnessed a number of significant changes directly related to mining operations. Population declines, service provision declines, and a changing employment have all occurred since the mine's closure in 2002. The community have invested considerable time and effort examining possible transitions.

History
In 1969, Sherritt Gordon Mines discovered a vast copper and zinc ore body at Ruttan Lake. As a result of this substantial discovery, there was an urgent demand for a community to provide support services for the mine and its workers. The first residents of Leaf Rapids arrived in 1971 and the community's infrastructure was completed in the fall of 1976. During this same year, the community's population exceeded 2,000 residents. Leaf Rapids is sometimes described as the "instant town" due to the fast construction time and the large population that gathered during the short time period.

The Ruttan Mine was closed down in the summer of 2002.

In March 2007 it became the first municipality in Canada to ban the use of plastic shopping bags.

Demographics 

Planning
The government of Manitoba decided that the past mistakes in the planning of northern resource communities should not be repeated, and participated directly in the planning of the community. An entirely new approach to building was conceived. In July 1970, the Leaf Rapids Development Corporation Ltd. (a Manitoba provincial crown corporation) was charged with the responsibility of building the Town of Leaf Rapids – 25 kilometres away from Ruttan Lake. The town was constructed with a deep respect for the wilderness that is incorporated into every aspect of the community, from construction to infrastructure to recreation. In June 1971, the construction of Leaf Rapids began, ensuring that much of the natural vegetation would be saved. Even in present-day Leaf Rapids, a permit must be obtained before cutting down any trees within the town limits.

The Town Centre Complex contains the following:
Leaf Rapids Education Centre
Leaf Rapids Town Offices
Leaf Rapids Consumer Cooperative
Library
Art Gallery - Currently closed.
Restaurant - Currently closed. (September 2009)
Hotel - Currently closed.
Gymnasium
Hockey arena - Currently closed. (September 2009)
Curling club (4 sheets of ice) - Currently closed. (September 2009)
Health Centre

Awards
Built in a semicircle of residential bays around the Town Centre Complex, Leaf Rapids won the coveted Vincent Massey Award for Urban Excellence in 1975. The Town Centre Complex was built of a material that was supposed to turn bright blue as it reacted over time to air pollution; however, in this remote part of the world, there is no air pollution, causing the Town Centre Complex to remain rust colored. During the first four years of its life, architects and town planners from across Canada and around the world – some as far away as Japan – visited Leaf Rapids to view its unique design and infrastructure. Over the years, other towns followed suit and today Leaf Rapids is not alone in offering modern urban convenience in the midst of a commanding wilderness – but Leaf Rapids was the first.

Transportation
Leaf Rapids is located adjacent to provincial highway 391. Highway 391 connects the communities of Thompson, Lynn Lake, the Nisichawayasihk Cree Nation, Granville Lake, and South Indian Lake.

Six kilometres north of Leaf Rapids is the Leaf Rapids Airport. As of 2007, there was no regular commercial air service at the airport. A number of small local companies provide charter passenger and cargo services. Calm Air used to fly regular passenger flights from Leaf Rapids to Thompson, however these flights have ceased since the Ruttan Mine closed.

In 2007 the community again made headlines by proposing the use of golf carts for local transport. Golf carts were offered as an incentive to new buyers of homes in the community.

Education
Leaf Rapids is home to the Leaf Rapids Education Centre. The centre provides kindergarten to grade 12 services. The school is part of the Frontier School Division. In 2005/2006, the Leaf Rapids Education Centre had a student population of 163.

Health care
The Leaf Rapids Health Centre is part of the Northern Health Region (NHR). The Health Centre provides a range of services to community residents. The Health Centre is staffed with registered nurses, a lab technologist, and other support staff. The community is also served by an NHR ambulance service.

Law enforcement
The Leaf Rapids Royal Canadian Mounted Police detachment polices Leaf Rapids, South Indian Lake, and Granville Lake. The detachment is made up of a sergeant, one corporal, six constables, and an administrative public service employee.

Notes and references

External links
Town of Leaf Rapids

Towns in Manitoba
Mining communities in Manitoba